Mermeristis spodiaea is a moth of the family Oecophoridae first described by Edward Meyrick in 1915. It is found in Tasmania, Australia and New Zealand.

References

Moths described in 1915
Oecophoridae
Taxa named by Edward Meyrick
Moths of New Zealand
Endemic fauna of New Zealand
Endemic moths of New Zealand